The men's team pursuit in the 2010–11 ISU Speed Skating World Cup was contested over three races on three occasions, out of a total of eight World Cup occasions for the season, with the first occasion involving the distance taking place in Berlin, Germany, on 19–21 November 2010, and the final occasion involving the distance taking place in Moscow, Russia, on 4–6 March 2011.

Norway successfully defended their title, while Russia came second, and the United States came third.

Top three

Race medallists

Standings
Standings as of 6 March 2011 (end of the season).

References

Men team pursuit